The Amritsar–Khem Karan line is a railway route on the Northern Railway zone of Indian Railways. This route plays an important role in rail transportation in Punjab state.

The corridor passes through the Plain Areas of Punjab and some portion are near the bank of Beas with a stretch of 77 km which connects  situates on Ambala–Attari line and Khem Karan.

History

 The first phase , from Amritsar Junction to Tarn Taran was opened on 21 September 1906.
 The second phase , from Tarn Taran to Patti was opened on 30 December 1906.
 The third phase , from Patti to Kasur was opened on 4 April 1910.
 The final phase , from Khem Karan to Kasur was opened on 3 January 1911.

After Partition of India in 1947,  The Khem Karan–Kasur link was totally dismantled and the trains run till Khem Karan.

Whereas, the branch line between Tarn Taran Junction and Beas Junction which lies on Ambala–Attari line was opened on different phases.

 The first phase, between Beas Junction to Goindwal was opened on 18 December 1997.
 The second phase, between Tarn Taran Junction to Goindwal was approved on 1997 and opened on 2000.

Electrification
The electrification was started on 2019, As the Amritsar–Tarn Taran–Beas section and the remaining section as Tarn Taran–Khem Karan section is going to be electrified.

Project

References

5 ft 6 in gauge railways in India
Firozpur railway division
Rail transport in Punjab, India